Chandi Jones (born March 25, 1982) is a professional basketball player. Jones is the daughter of Janice and David Jones , a former professional football player who later became a collegiate basketball coach.

High school
Born in Wharton, Texas, Jones was a basketball and long jump standout at Bay City High School in Bay City, Texas. Jones was named a WBCA All-American. She participated in the 2000 WBCA High School All-America Game, where she scored four points.

College
Jones attended college at University of Houston, where she helped bring the women's basketball program to national prominence.  During her freshman season, Jones tore an anterior cruciate ligament, and missed the final eleven games of the season.  Even with the injury, she was awarded the Conference USA Freshman of the Year honor and was also named to the All-Conference first team.  As a leader of the Lady Cougars, Jones helped the team advance to the finals of the 2002 Women's National Invitation Tournament, and to its first NCAA tournament berth in twelve years in 2004.  She was named the Conference USA Player of the Year three times, and was subsequently named Conference USA women's basketball Player of the Decade.  In 2005, Jones had her number (13) retired by the University of Houston, from which she graduated in 2004.  She is currently the all-time leading scorer in school and conference history.

Houston statistics

Source

USA Basketball
Jones was a member of the USA Women's U18 team which won the gold medal at the FIBA Americas Championship in Mar Del Plata, Argentina. The event was held in July 2000, when the USA team defeated Cuba to win the championship. Jones averaged 4.0 points per game.

Professional
Following her collegiate career, Jones was selected by the Phoenix Mercury 8th overall in the 2004 WNBA Draft before being traded to the Detroit Shock for Shereka Wright, Erika Valek and Sheila Lambert on draft day. On July 30, 2005 Jones was dealt to the Lynx along with Stacey Thomas and a draft pick for Katie Smith.

After averaging 5.0 points per game in her first two seasons, ankle and knee injuries limited Jones to just six games in 2006. She averaged just 2.8 points and 6.3 minutes in those contests. On May 18, 2007, Jones was released by the Lynx.

Jones played during the 2003-4 European women's basketball season for Maccabi Raanana in Israel, and during the 2006–7 season for a club in Budapest, Hungary.  In 2007–8, Jones signed with Israeli club Hapoel Tel Aviv, but was cut from the team after its first game of the season.

WNBA career statistics

Regular season

|-
| align="left" | 2004
| align="left" | Detroit
| 31 || 8 || 12.8 || .359 || .250 || .806 || 1.1 || 1.5 || 0.6 || 0.2 || 1.3 || 3.5
|-
| align="left" | 2005
| align="left" | Detroit
| 21 || 0 || 15.7 || .407 || .486 || .789 || 1.5 || 1.1 || 0.6 || 0.1 || 1.1 || 6.0
|-
| align="left" | 2005
| align="left" | Minnesota
| 10 || 9 || 28.1 || .349 || .344 || .632 || 3.3 || 3.0 || 1.3 || 0.3 || 1.7 || 8.1
|-
| align="left" | 2006
| align="left" | Minnesota
| 6 || 0 || 6.3 || .556 || .750 || 1.000 || 0.8 || 0.5 || 0.2 || 0.0 || 0.3 || 2.8
|-
| align="left" | Career
| align="left" | 3 years, 2 teams
| 68 || 17 || 15.4 || .380 || .381 || .767 || 1.5 || 1.5 || 0.7 || 0.1 || 1.2 || 4.9

Playoffs

|-
| align="left" | 2004
| align="left" | Detroit
| 2 || 0 || 5.0 || .250 || .000 || .000 || 0.0 || 0.5 || 0.0 || 0.0 || 0.5 || 1.0
|-
| align="left" | Career
| align="left" | 1 year, 1 team
| 2 || 0 || 5.0 || .250 || .000 || .000 || 0.0 || 0.5 || 0.0 || 0.0 || 0.5 || 1.0

Notes

External links
WNBA Player Profile

1982 births
Living people
All-American college women's basketball players
American women's basketball players
Basketball players from Texas
Detroit Shock players
Houston Cougars women's basketball players
Minnesota Lynx players
People from Wharton, Texas
Phoenix Mercury draft picks
Shooting guards